An Imperial Army is an army of any empire. However, only some empires in history and in fiction have actually referred to their armies as "The Imperial Army".

Former Imperial Armies

In Europe
 The Army of the Roman Empire (until 284)
 The Army of the Western Roman Empire (until 476)
 The Army of the Eastern Roman Empire (until 640)
 The Army of the Holy Roman Empire  (until 1806)
 The Army of the Holy Roman Emperor (until 1806)
 The Army of the German Empire (1871-1918)
 The Austro-Hungarian Army (1804-1918)
 The Imperial Russian Army (1721-1917)
 The French Imperial Army (1804-1814 and 1815)

Elsewhere
 The Imperial Japanese Army
 The Imperial Chinese Army
 The Manchukuo Imperial Army
 The Imperial Iranian Army
 The Imperial Brazilian Army

Fictional
 The Imperial Army (Star Wars) of the fictional Galactic Empire in Star Wars
 The Imperial Army of the Archadian Empire in the video game Final Fantasy XII
 The Imperial Army of the Imperium of Man in Warhammer 40000

See also
Royal Army (disambiguation)